Corymbia abbreviata, also known as the scraggy bloodwood, is a species of straggly tree that is native to Western Australia and the Northern Territory. It has rough bark, a crown of stiff leaves arranged in opposite pairs, flower buds usually in crowded groups on the ends of branchlets and urn-shaped fruit.

Description
It has tessellated, flaky, grey-brown over red-brown bark. The branchlets are silvery to green, smooth, glabrous and lack oil glands in the pith. Flowering occurs between July and January and the flowers are creamy white.

Taxonomy and naming
Scraggy bloodwood was first formally described in 1934 by William Blakely and Maxwell Jacobs and given the name Eucalyptus abbreviata, in Blakely's book A Key to the Eucalypts. In 1995, Ken Hill and Lawrie Johnson changed the name to Corymbia abbreviata. The specific epithet (abbreviata) is from the Latin word abbreviatus meaning "shortened" referring to the flower heads.

Distribution and habitat
Corymbia abbreviata has a scattered distribution extending from Wyndham and Karunji in the Kimberley region of Western Australia and east as far as Dorisvale and Willeroo in the Northern Territory. The distribution of C. abbreviata coincides with C. ferruginea. It grows in skeletal soils, on stony slopes, ridges and outcrops of sandstone, granite or quartzite.

See also
List of Corymbia species

References

abbreviata
Myrtales of Australia
Flora of Western Australia
Flora of the Northern Territory
Plants described in 1934